Batilda Salha Burian (born October 19, 1965) is a Tanzanian politician and ambassador. Currently, she is the Tanzanian ambassador to Japan.

Biography 
Burian received her PhD from the University College of London in 1992.

She served two terms in Parliament, from 2000 to 2005 and then in 2006 to 2010. Between her terms in Parliament, she was the Deputy Minister of Community Development, Gender and Children. After Parliament, she became the High Commissioner (or ambassador) of Tanzania in Kenya. During her time as the ambassador to Kenya, she continued to strengthen ties between the two countries, citing that both countries have much in common both culturally and environmentally. In 2015, she became the Tanzanian ambassador to Japan.

Burian has chaired the World Climate Change Forum III in 2009 in Geneva and is also a permanent representative of Tanzania to the United Nations Environment Program (UNEP).

References

Living people
Members of the National Assembly (Tanzania)
1965 births
Ambassadors of Tanzania to Japan
High Commissioners of Tanzania to Kenya
Alumni of the University of London
Tanzanian women ambassadors
Women government ministers of Tanzania